The Harry W. Colmery Veterans Educational Assistance Act of 2017 (Public Law 115-48), commonly known as the "Forever GI Bill", eliminated the 15-year use-it-or-lose-it constraint associated with the Post-9/11 GI Bill education benefit. The updated bill was created with the intent of improving previous versions of the bill and the Reserve Educational Assistance Program (REAP) which is now defunct. The bill, called the Harry W. Colmery Veterans Education Assistance Act of 2017, flew through both the House of Representatives and the Senate in the span of three weeks, passing both by unanimous votes. After the Senate's vote, the bill was signed into law by President Donald Trump.

The official name of the bill is for Harry W. Colmery who is credited with being the author of the original GI Bill (Servicemen's Readjustment Act of 1944).

Overview 
The Forever GI Bill includes 34 provisions, 15 of which have the most substantial impact on the greatest number of servicemen, veterans, their dependents, and their beneficiaries. Some of the changes were positive, although some changes reduced coverage and/or eligibility. The most impactful 15 include:

 Elimination of the 15-year limitation on the use of the Post-9/11 GI Bill benefits.
 Restoration of lost GI Bill entitlement due to school closures.
 Expansion of benefits to Purple Heart recipients.
 Added Yellow Ribbon Program coverage to Fry Scholarship and Purple Heart recipients.
 Expanded Yellow Ribbon Program coverage for Active Duty members.
 Changed the entitlement use for licensing and certification tests.
 Reduced the amount authorized for Basic Allowance for Housing (BAH).
 Changed how the Basic Allowance for Housing is calculated.
 Changed Post-9/11 GI Bill eligibility tiering for National Guard and Reservists.
 Increased GI Bill eligibility for National Guard and Reservists.
 Changed the transfer of Post-9/11 GI Bill benefits.
 Reduced the number of months of coverage under the Survivors’ and Dependents Educational Assistance Program (DEA).
 Increased DEA payment structure.
 Creation of a STEM scholarship program.
 Creation of a High Technology pilot program.

There are several lesser known changes that include:

 Permanent work study program approval.
 Mandatory training for school certifying officials.
 VetSuccess program expansion.
 GI Bill usage data.
 VA automation.
 Priority enrollment expansion.

Summary of Changes

Effectiveness of the GI Bill
A 2021 study published by the National Bureau of Economic Research (NBER) indicates that the GI Bill has had limited value, and in some cases may be less valuable for veterans than working after leaving military service. According to the authors "All veterans who were already enrolled in college at the time of bill passage increase their months of schooling, but only for those in public institutions did this translate into increases in bachelor’s degree attainment and longer-run earnings. For specific groups of students, large subsidies can modestly help degree completion but harm long run earnings due to lost labor market experience."

Additional Resources 

 https://www.militarytimes.com/education-transition/education/2017/08/16/trump-signed-the-forever-gi-bill-here-are-11-things-you-should-know/
 https://www.politico.com/story/2017/08/02/veterans-defense-gi-bill-241266
 https://nvest.studentveterans.org/wp-content/uploads/2017/07/Things-to-Know-About-the-Forever-GI-Bill_SVA-1.pdf 
 https://taskandpurpose.com/gi-bill-forever-budget-resources
 https://www.benefits.va.gov/GIBILL/docs/fgib/FGIB_Veteran_Webinar.pdf

References

External links

 

History of veterans' affairs in the United States
United States federal education legislation
United States federal legislation articles without infoboxes